Sir George Smyth Baden-Powell,  (24 December 1847 – 20 November 1898), was a son of the mathematician Baden Powell. He served as a commissioner in Victoria, Australia, the West Indies, Malta and Canada.

Birth
His father was the Reverend Professor Baden Powell, who held the Savilian Chair of Geometry at the University of Oxford from 1827 to 1860.

His mother, Henrietta Grace, was the third wife of Baden Powell (the previous two having died). She was the elder daughter of William Henry Smyth and his wife Annarella.

Education
He was educated at St. Paul's School, London, and at Marlborough College, Marlborough, Wiltshire. He went on to Balliol College, Oxford University, from which he graduated as a Doctor of Law (LL.D.).

Career
He was appointed a Fellow of the Royal Society (F.R.S.).  He was an author on political, financial and colonial topics. He was Conservative MP for Liverpool Kirkdale from 1885 to 1898.

Honours
He was appointed Companion, Order of St. Michael and St. George (C.M.G.) in 1884. He held the office of Member of Parliament (M.P.) (Conservative) for Liverpool, Kirkdale Division between 1885 and 1898. He was appointed Knight Commander, Order of St. Michael and St. George (K.C.M.G.) in 1888.

Family
On 8 April 1893 in Cheltenham George married Frances, daughter of Charles Wilson, of Cheltenham, Gloucestershire. They had a daughter, Maud Kirkdale Baden-Powell (27 July 1895 – 6 Dec 1981), and a son, Donald Ferlys Wilson Baden-Powell (1897–1973). Frances died aged 50 in Cheltenham on 29 Oct 1913.

Exploration
In 1896 he took his yacht Otaria to the island of Novaya Zemlya in the Arctic to observe that year's total solar eclipse. On his return to Vardø, Norway, he met his friend Fritjof Nansen who had just returned from his three-year drift and trek across the Arctic. George, having intended to start a search for Nansen, put his yacht at Nansen's disposal to search for Nansen's ship, the Fram, but they had only reached Hammerfest (300 miles West along the Northern Norwegian coast) when the news reached them that the Fram had also arrived back in Norway.

Publications

References

External links 

 
Parliamentary Archives, Papers of Sir George Smyth Baden-Powell (1847-98), MP

1847 births
1898 deaths
Alumni of Balliol College, Oxford
Conservative Party (UK) MPs for English constituencies
Knights Commander of the Order of St Michael and St George
UK MPs 1885–1886
UK MPs 1886–1892
UK MPs 1892–1895
UK MPs 1895–1900
George